The Battle of Mount Tabor was fought on 16 April 1799, between French forces commanded by Napoleon Bonaparte and General Jean-Baptiste Kléber, against an Ottoman Army under Abdullah Pasha al-Azm, ruler of Damascus. The battle was a consequence of the siege of Acre, in the later stages of the French Campaign in Egypt and Syria.

Upon hearing that a Turkish and Mamluk army had been sent from Damascus to Acre, for the purpose of forcing the French to raise the siege of Acre, General Bonaparte sent out detachments to track it down. General Kléber led an advance guard and boldly decided to engage the much larger Turkish army of 35,000 men near Mount Tabor, managing to hold it off until Napoleon drove General Louis André Bon’s division of 2,000 men in a circling manoeuvre and took the Turks completely by surprise in their rear.

The resulting battle saw the outnumbered French force inflict thousands of casualties and scatter the remaining forces of the pasha of Damascus, forcing them to abandon their hopes of reconquering Egypt and leaving Napoleon free to carry on the siege of Acre.

Background
By April, during the siege of Acre, Napoleon had become concerned about his strategic situation and the possible presence of large Ottoman forces in the vicinity. This resulted in more supervision of his subordinates and detailed instructions, which Kléber chafed at. While in Nazareth, Kléber received news that a large Ottoman force was encamped near Mount Tabor, and saw a chance to make a name for himself. After taking the precaution to write to Napoleon of his intentions (but too late for Napoleon to respond), Kléber took his division of 2,000 men in the hopes of launching a daring night raid on the Ottoman camp. His plan was to march around the northern side of Mount Tabor to surprise the Ottoman forces at 2am.

Battle
Kléber had badly estimated how long the march would take and did not reach the plain below Mount Tabor until 6am, by which time the sun had risen. The Ottoman forces, consisting of 10,000 infantry and 25,000 cavalry, spotted Kléber, who realised that his best bet was to form two infantry squares to defend against attack, then hopefully retreat during the night. However as the day wore on, it became clear to both Kléber and the Ottomans that his position could not last, as Kléber's men were running out of ammunition, thirsty and starving.

Just when all seemed to be lost, some of his soldiers claimed to have seen bayonets advancing from the north. Kléber tried to verify their report by climbing to a vantage point and using his telescope but saw nothing. Desperate, Kléber prepared to abandon his artillery and wounded, and attempt a breakout, every man for himself. However, Kléber's men had not been mistaken: Napoleon was marching to their aid with 2,000 men. When Kléber had looked, Napoleon's forces had marched behind head-high wild wheat, which made them invisible from the battlefield.

Napoleon found himself between the Ottomans and their camp. He ordered a part of his force to form squares and march upon an embankment, which made them visible to both the Ottomans and the French under Kléber, coordinated with a salvo from his artillery to announce his presence. The Ottoman forces were briefly distracted by this but were soon reassured by the sight of their advancing Mamluk cavalry and Nablus tribesmen. Seeing that the Ottomans would stand their ground, Napoleon sent three of his squares to march out, in between the Ottomans and their camp. Simultaneously, he sent 300 men into the camp, with orders to set fire to all the tents and make a show of seizing supplies and camels. Upon seeing the destruction of their belongings and Napoleon's squares blocking the way to save their camp, the Ottomans felt cut off and were thrown into confusion.

Kléber saw his chance, and ordered his men to charge, which supported by the soldiers under Napoleon transformed the Ottoman retreat into a general rout. Ottoman cavalry headed for the mountains in the south, while their infantry scattered toward the Jordan River. Recent rains had risen the water of the river and made its banks into a quagmire, and this poor timing resulted in thousands of casualties for the retreating Ottoman infantry.

Aftermath
French casualties were two dead and sixteen wounded, but had Napoleon arrived just an hour later, casualties would have been far more serious. Although the Ottomans fled before really significant losses could be inflicted, it was estimated that 6,000 of the army of Damascus perished. With the threat of a relief army eliminated, Napoleon led his troops back to Acre to continue the siege. A month later when more men became sick with the plague he decided to abandon Acre and retreat back to Egypt.

Notes

References

Further reading

External links

 Napoleonic guide – description of the battle
 Battle of Mount Tabor with detailed map. At Napoléon & Empire website. Accessed 10 May 2020.
 Napoleon Wins the Battle of Mount Tabor, with recent photo of the battleground. At Segula magazine. Accessed 10 May 2020.

Notes

Mount Tabor 1799
1799 in Ottoman Syria
Mount Tabor
Mount Tabor
Mount Tabor
1799 in the Ottoman Empire
1799 in Asia
French campaign in Egypt and Syria
Battles inscribed on the Arc de Triomphe
Mount Tabor